Mingardi is a surname. Notable people with the surname include:

Andrea Mingardi (born 1940), Italian singer-songwriter, composer, musician, author, and actor
Camilla Mingardi (born 1997), Italian volleyball player
Giovanni Battista Mingardi (died 1796), Italian painter

See also
Minardi (disambiguation)